Husain Ali Khan Bahadur was Nawab of Masulipatam in India.

He was son of Nawab Daud Ali Khan Bahadur. He was married to Abbasi Begum Sahiba (first) and Dildar Begum Sahiba (second). He had a son named Nawab Reza Ali Khan - II.

Official name
His official name was Qutb ud-Mulk, Mubarak ud-Daula, Nawab Husain 'Ali Khan Bahadur, Mubarak Jang.

Titles held

See also
Nawab of Carnatic
Nawab of Banganapalle

Nawabs of India